McArras Brook (Scottish Gaelic: Allt Mhic Àra) is a small community in the Canadian province of Nova Scotia, located  in Antigonish County. It was named for the original settler, James McCara from Perthshire, Scotland.

References

Communities in Antigonish County, Nova Scotia